Pelekanos (before 1927: Πέλκα - Pelka) is a small village in the municipality of Voio, West Macedonia periphery, Greece. With a population of around 269 (2011), mostly elderly, residents it is set at the foothills (760m) of Mount Askio. The Byzantine historian Procopius mentions the location as Justinian I's fortress of "Pelekon". Ruins of the fortress can be found in the surrounding area to this day. During the early 20th century, the region became relatively poor and economically isolated and consequently a significant part of its population emigrated abroad. Nowadays, the village is well-connected through a modern highway (Via Egnatia) and is known for its red wine production and also as the filming location of Glory Sky (Greek: Ουρανός - Ouranos) which officially represented  Greece in the 1963 Cannes Film Festival.

References

Populated places in Kozani (regional unit)